Sibling abuse includes the physical, psychological, or sexual abuse of one sibling by another. More often than not, the younger sibling is abused by the older sibling, however this is not always the case. Sibling abuse is the most common of family violence in the US, but the least reported. As opposed to sibling rivalry, sibling abuse is characterized by the one-sided treatment of one sibling to another. 

Sibling abuse has been found to most commonly occur in dysfunctional families where abuse from parents is present. In the US, 40% of children have engaged in physical aggression towards a sibling, and as many as 85% of children have engaged in verbal abuse towards their sibling.

Types and prevalence

Physical abuse
Sibling physical abuse is defined as a sibling deliberately causing violence to another sibling. The abuse can be inflicted with shoving, hitting, slapping, kicking, biting, pinching, scratching, and hair-pulling. Sibling physical abuse is more common than peer bullying and other forms of family abuse, such as spousal or child abuse, though for a multitude of reasons, it is very difficult to calculate exact prevalence rates. Even when sibling abuse is recognized it remains heavily under-reported, due to the lack of resources provided to families, such as child protective services and mandatory reporters. Professional childcare providers have considerably different definitions of the term, and lack a system to track reports. Sibling physical abuse persists from childhood through adulthood, with prevalence rates varying across studies, though its intensity and frequency declines as the victim and/or perpetrator grow up.

Sibling aggression is somewhat common even in families that could not be classified as pervasively abusive, with 37% of 498 children committing at least one act of serious abuse during the previous year; in abusive families, 100% of children committed at least one act of serious abuse. In Pakistani immigrant families in the UK, siblings have the highest proportion of physical abuse compared to other family members, with 35% being done by siblings, compared to 33% by mothers and 19% by fathers. 

Several studies show that sisters are more likely to be victimized by brothers than vice versa. Additionally, age is also a contributing factor to sibling abuse, where older siblings are more likely to abuse the younger siblings.

Psychological abuse 
Psychological abuse among siblings is even more difficult to identify. Psychological abuse in siblings can be identified by both the frequency and intensity of harmful interaction. These interactions can include ridicule to express contempt, as well as degradation towards the others self-esteem. Adults, such as the parents or professional care providers have difficulty differentiating between psychological aggression and abuse because it is difficult to identify when the balance of power is not evenly distributed. Hence, the consequences of the aggression are not only injury, but also control or domination of one sibling over the other. Although it has been found to be the most prevalent type of abuse in sibling conflict, prevalence rates are difficult to calculate, due to the difficulty in differentiating aggression from abuse. Whipple and Finton report that "Psychological maltreatment between siblings is one of the most common, yet often under-recognized forms of child abuse." Bagley and Ramsey, Mullen, Martin, Anderson, Romans and Herbison, Kurtz, Gaudin, Wodarski, and Howing, and Beitchman et al., are some of the researchers that have found negative psychological, academic, and social consequences to be related to sibling aggression and abuse; despite this, causal inference requires more study. Caffaro and Conn-Caffaro report, based on their research, that adult sibling abuse survivors have much higher rates of emotional cutoff (34%) with brothers and sisters than what is evident in the general population (<6%).

Sexual abuse
Sexual sibling abuse is defined as sexual behavior "that is not age appropriate, not transitory, and not motivated by developmentally appropriate curiosity." To identify sexual abuse, there needs to be coercion and domination over one sibling.  Prevalence rates are also difficult to calculate for several reasons: victims do not realize that they are suffering abuse, until they reach maturity, and have a better understanding of the role they played during the encounters, they are afraid of reporting, and there is no consensus on a definition of sibling sexual abuse. The average age of the offender is fifteen, where the average age of the victim is nine.

As with other forms of abuse among siblings, There is a large lack of reporting in sibling sexual abuse, as parents either do not recognize it as being abuse or try to cover the abuse. An increased risk of sibling sexual abuse may be found in a heightened sexual climate in a family, or a rigidly sexually repressed family environments. Sexual abuse in siblings may have long-term affects on the victims. Many victims have been diagnosed with a variety of psychological problems." Victims have been recorded to correlate pain and fear with sex, leading to long term issues with intimacy.

Rudd and Herzberger report that brothers who committed incest were more likely to use force than fathers who commit incest (64% vs. 53%). Similarly, Cyr and colleagues found that about 70% of sibling incest involved sexual penetration, substantially higher than other forms of incest. Bass and colleagues write that "sibling incest occurs at a frequency that rivals and may even exceed other forms of incest," yet only 11% of studies into child sexual abuse examined sibling perpetrators. Rayment and Owen report that "[in comparison of] the offending patterns of sibling offenders with other teenage sex offenders ... Sibling abusers admitted to more sexual offenses, had a higher recidivism rate, and a majority engaged in more intrusive sexual behaviour than other adolescent sex offenders. The sibling perpetrator has more access to the victim and exists within a structure of silence and guilt." A survey of eight hundred college students reported by David Finkelhor in the Journal of Marriage and Family Counseling found that fifteen percent of females and ten percent of males had been sexually abused by an older sibling.

Identification

Sibling rivalry, competition, and disagreements are considered normal components of childhood and adolescence. To identify physical, psychological, and relational sibling abuse, practitioners and parents need to observe behavior and ask questions about the sibling's relationships that will help them understand if there are characteristics that differentiate aggression from abuse. Sexual sibling abuse requires additional considerations. Victims may initially deny the existence of any type of abuse but this may be because they haven't realized it yet. Different questions about the prevalence of types of aggression, frequency, the intention of harm, the magnitude of the aggression, and unidirectional dominance help assess the existence of abuse. Regarding sexual abuse, individuals are less likely to openly talk about it, unlike other forms of abuse such as physical or psychological. For this reason, in addition to asking direct questions about sibling sexual abuse, practitioners and parents must look out for behaviors that may indicate the presence of sexual abuse. Another challenge comes when differentiating between sexual abuse and adequate sexual behavior. The biggest difference relies on how incest happens with the consensus of both siblings while sexual abuse does not. A victim may not be aware that he/she did not consent because of innocence or lack of understanding of what was happening. The latter generally happens to children who are too young to understand sexual implications and boundaries.

Weihe suggests that four criteria should be used to determine if questionable behavior is rivalry or abusive. First, one must determine if the questionable behavior is age-appropriate, since children use different conflict-resolution tactics during various developmental stages. Second, one must determine if the behavior is an isolated incident or part of an enduring pattern: abuse is, by definition, a long-term pattern rather than occasional disagreements. Third, one must determine if there is an "aspect of victimization" to the behavior: rivalry tends to be incident-specific, reciprocal, and obvious to others, while abuse is characterized by secrecy and an imbalance of power. Fourth, one must determine the goal of the questionable behavior: the goal of abuse tends to be embarrassment or domination of the victim.

Risk factors
There are several important risk factors associated with sibling abuse. They can be categorized into family system, parenting behavior, individual, and other risk factors.

Family system 
This category of risk factors associated with sibling abuse looks at the family system as a whole. It includes negative and conflictual parent-child relationships, parental hostility toward a child, spousal abuse, partner conflict, marital conflict, mother's marital dissatisfaction and negative emotional expressiveness, maternal self-criticism, financial stress, low family cohesion, family disorganization, and household chaos, husband's losses of temper, low maternal education, and family triangulation.

Parenting behavior 
This category of risk factors associated with sibling abuse examines the parenting behavior of adult caregivers. It includes parental differential treatment of children, fathers favoring later-born sisters, active and direct judgmental comparison, parents labeling their children "bad-good" and "easy-difficult", low parental involvement, particularly by fathers, ineffective parenting, inconsistent discipline, coercive parenting, maternal coercive, rejecting, and over-controlling behaviors, parental abuse of children, parent's use of violence to resolve parent-child conflict, parental neglect and approval of aggression, corporal punishment, not providing supervision, not intervening in sibling conflict, not acknowledging child-voiced claims of maltreatment, not reinforcing pro-social behaviors, and restricting children's efforts to diversify interests and specialization.

Individual 
This category of risk factors associated with sibling abuse considers individual traits of the offender child and the victim child. For offender children, known individual risk factors include lack of empathy for victims, aggressive temperament, lower or higher self-esteem than peers, unmet personal needs for physical contact in emotion-deprived environments, experience of victimization, including by siblings, sibling caretaking of younger brothers and sisters, and boredom. For victim children, a known risk factor is psychological distress such as anger, depression, and anxiety from violence victimization by siblings (linked to re-victimization).

Other risk factors 
Several other risk factors are associated with sibling abuse. One is birth order and age spacing. Martin and Ross found that first-born children were more likely to be sibling abuse offenders. Imitating an older sibling's aggressive behavior, being given the task of sibling caretaking, and close age spacing were also found to be closely associated with sibling abuse.

Another risk factor is gender. The presence of a male child within the sibling group and older brother-younger sister pairs are associated with the occurrence of sibling abuse and being female is associated with the experience of victimization by a sibling.

Sociocultural background also factors into sibling abuse. Some known sociocultural background risk factors include cultural practices such as primogeniture and patriarchy, disability of a sibling, family economic pressure, excessive sibling caregiving, and ethnic/cultural background in which sibling aggression is widely condoned.

Parental alcoholism, parental support of child aggression, and social glorification of violence in the media have also been associated with sibling abuse.

Potential effects 

The effects of sibling abuse closely parallel those of other forms of child abuse.

Potential effects of sibling abuse include difficulty separating pleasure from pain and fear from desire in a sexual relationship, depression, eating disorders, substance abuse, low self-esteem, and suicide, re-victimization in adulthood, prostitution in later life, difficulty in developing and sustaining intimate relationships, trouble negotiating boundaries, sexual issues, and interdependency in relationships, shame, fear, humiliation, anger, and guilt, severe psychiatric disorders such as dissociative coping and complex post traumatic stress disorder, a wide variety of health and mental health issues, significant problems with affect regulation, impulse control, somatization, sense of self, cognitive distortions, and problems with socialization, and higher risk of pregnancy than father-daughter incest.

Potential effects of sibling violence include severe symptoms of trauma, anxiety, and depression, including sleeplessness, suicidal ideation, and fear of the dark, loneliness and psychological difficulties, and aggression and delinquency.

Prevention 
Jonathan Caspi identified several prevention methods for children and families, educators and practitioners, researchers, and the culture at large in Sibling Aggression: Assessment and Treatment (2012). For children and families, pro-social skill development to increase social-emotional competencies with siblings and parental training can be used to prevent sibling abuse. For educators and practitioners, addressing sibling relationships in the curriculum can help prevent sibling abuse. For researchers, giving attention to sibling relationships and developing prevention programs in collaboration with practitioners may create potential prevention methods for sibling abuse. For the culture at large, Caspi proposes not accepting sibling aggression as normal, public awareness and educational campaigns, and making sibling aggression visible.

Treatment 
John V. Caffaro outlines clinical best practices for treatment of sibling abuse in Sibling Abuse Trauma: Assessment and Intervention Strategies for Children, Families, and Adults (2014). They include “extra precautions to ensure the victim's safety, such as locks on doors, increased adult supervision, and cooperation of parents, extended family members, and the community”, “individual treatment for the victim and the offender, often with different clinicians possessing expertise in child abuse trauma”, and “no conjoint sibling or family meetings with the offender until he or she has accepted full responsibility for the abuse and until the therapist is satisfied that the family can and will protect the victim from further abuse”.

Media portrayals 
An important plot point within the traditional fairy tale of Cinderella is the eponymous main character's cruel treatment at the hands of her stepsisters with their mother's implicit approval.

The 1991 made-for-TV movie My Son, Johnny is a rare fictionalized portrayal of sibling abuse. The film stars Corin Nemec as a teenager victimized by his older brother, played by Rick Schroder. The film was inspired by the real-life case of Philadelphia fifteen-year-old Michael Lombardo, tried and acquitted for the 1985 killing of his nineteen-year-old brother, Francis "Frankie" Lombardo, who had battered and abused him for years. Not depicted in the film, Michael Lombardo committed suicide in 1989 by drug overdose, following a bank robbery in Lansford, PA.

British soap opera, Brookside, ran a controversial storyline in 1996, featuring incest between siblings Nat and Georgia Simpson that resulted in a pregnancy, which was followed by an abortion. The sympathetic portrayal of the situation attracted criticism from journalist Peter Hitchens in his book The Abolition of Britain.

Notable examples 
Cheyenne Brando, the daughter of the legendary actor Marlon Brando, confessed that her brother Christian seemed to be in love with her, and that he was jealous of her boyfriend Dag Drollet; that is why Christian killed him in 1990, according to Cheyenne. Christian stated during his trial that Cheyenne told him that Dag was abusive to her, and that he wanted to protect her, and that he never meant to kill Dag; it was a "terrible accident". Christian was sentenced to ten years in jail in 1991, and Cheyenne committed suicide in 1995. Cheyenne was abusive toward her two sisters, Maimiti and Raiatua, as well as towards Marlon Brando and Tarita, her parents, particularly her mother. Tarita Teriipaia wrote a book in 2005, which revealed Cheyenne terrorized her own family, as a result of her suffering from schizophrenia.

The French serial killer Guy Georges physically abused his adoptive elder sisters when he was 14, nearly killing them.

In 2013, the Australian actor Hugh Jackman opened up about the physical and verbal abuse by his older brother. He said the abuse helped his acting in Wolverine, and that when his brother apologized, Jackman felt released.

See also 
Child-on-child sexual abuse
Child sexual abuse 
Siblicide
Sibling relationship

References

External Links
University of New Hampshire, Crimes Against Children Research Center, Sibling Aggression and Abuse Research and Advocacy Initiative (SAARA) https://www.unh.edu/ccrc/sibling-aggression-abuse-research-advocacy-initiative-saara

Further reading
 Wiehe, Vernon R. What Parents Need to Know About Sibling Abuse: Breaking the Cycle of Violence  (2002)
 Caffaro., J. & Conn-Caffaro, A. (1998). Sibling Abuse Trauma, NY: Routledge.  
 
Caffaro, J. (2013). Sibling abuse trauma. 2nd Edition. NY: Routledge.
Caspi, J. (2012). Sibling Aggression: Assessment and Treatment. NY: Springer Publishing

Child abuse
Domestic violence
Abuse
Incestual abuse
Sibling rivalry